Pierangelo Bertoli (5 November 1942 – 7 October 2002) was an Italian singer-songwriter and poet. Close to libertarian communist issues his works told mainly about environment, laïcité, antimilitarism and social issues regarding marginalized and rebellious people.

Biography
Born in Sassuolo, in the Province of Modena and belonging to a working-class family, when he was four, he developed poliomyelitis and he lost use of his legs. He started his career of singer at the end of 1973 with the album Rosso colore dell'amore (1974) and one year later with the self-produced album Roca Blues. One of his most famous album was A muso duro of 1979.

In 1990, he collaborated with Elio e le Storie Tese. In 1991 (with Tazenda) and 1992 he took part to the Sanremo Music Festival.

His last album, 301 guerre fa (2002) was composed with the collaboration of his son Alberto and Luciano Ligabue. He also collaborated and realized a singled called "Promissas" with the Sardinian band Istentales.
Bertoli died in Modena on 7 October 2002 of a heart attack due to a tumor.

Married to Bruna, Bertoli had 3 children, Emiliano, Petra and Alberto, also a singer.

Discography

Rosso colore dell'amore (1974)
Roca Blues (1975)
Eppure soffia (1976)
Il centro del fiume (1977)
S'at ven in meint (1978)
A muso duro (1979)
Certi momenti (1980)
Album (1981)
Frammenti (1983)
Dalla finestra (1984)
Petra (1985)
Canzone d'autore (1987)
Tra me e me (1988)
Sedia elettrica (1989)
Oracoli (1990)
Italia d'oro (1992)
Gli anni miei (1993)
Una voce tra due fuochi (1995)
Angoli di vita (1997)
301 guerre fa (2002)
Promissas (2002, single)

References

Sources

External links
 
 Bertoli Fans Club (Official Bertoli website)

1942 births
2002 deaths
People from Sassuolo
Italian male singer-songwriters
Italian communists
Italian libertarians
Italian atheists
20th-century Italian male singers
People with polio
Deaths from cancer in Emilia-Romagna